Calothrix is a genus of cyanobacteria. They are generally found in freshwater.

References

Rivulariaceae
Cyanobacteria genera